Paulo André Jukoski da Silva (born December 24, 1963), known as Paulão, is a Brazilian former volleyball player who competed in the 1988 Summer Olympics, in the 1992 Summer Olympics, and in the 1996 Summer Olympics.

He was born in Porto Alegre.

In 1988 he was part of the Brazilian team which finished fourth in the Olympic tournament. He played all seven matches.

Four years later he won the gold medal with the Brazilian team in the 1992 Olympic tournament. He played all eight matches.

At the 1996 Games he was a member of the Brazilian team which finished fifth in the Olympic tournament. He played seven matches.

References
 

1963 births
Living people
Brazilian men's volleyball players
Olympic volleyball players of Brazil
Volleyball players at the 1988 Summer Olympics
Volleyball players at the 1992 Summer Olympics
Volleyball players at the 1996 Summer Olympics
Olympic gold medalists for Brazil
Sportspeople from Porto Alegre
Brazilian people of Polish descent
Olympic medalists in volleyball
Medalists at the 1992 Summer Olympics